Taylor Beach is a hamlet in the Canadian province of Saskatchewan.

Taylor Beach is located in the RM of North Qu'Appelle No. 187 on the north side of a point of land on the western shore of Katepwa Lake, directly across from Katepwa Beach and Katepwa Point Provincial Park. Directly south of Taylor Beach, on the other side of the point, is Lake View Beach.

Demographics 

See also
List of hamlets in Saskatchewan
List of designated places in Saskatchewan
List of communities in Saskatchewan

References

Designated places in Saskatchewan
North Qu'Appelle No. 187, Saskatchewan
Organized hamlets in Saskatchewan
Division No. 6, Saskatchewan